LIME was a monthly magazine published under the umbrella of MediaCorp that targeted Asian youths and focused on tabloid breaking news, music, celebrity, entertainment and lifestyle.

Profile
The contents in LIME usually featured Asian celebrities and lifestyles of youth in Singapore and was different from 8 Days, another entertainment publication by MediaCorp Publishing.

LIME was published in two editions: Singapore Edition and Malaysia Edition

Awards
The magazine won two awards in ASIA Media Awards 2006 for Best in Design (Silver Award) and in the SOPA Awards 2005 for Excellence in Magazine Design (Honorable Mention).

Early Demise
Management decided in 2008 that LIME, both in Malaysia and Singapore, would be discontinued. While the Singaporean team was reshuffled to various departments, Angelina George the editor of the Malaysian edition was made Group Sub Editor. Michael Chiang has stayed on to be Editorial Consultant. The last issue of the magazine was published in October 2008.

References

External links
MediaCorp Publishing

2008 disestablishments in Singapore
Celebrity magazines
Defunct magazines published in Singapore
English-language magazines
Entertainment magazines
Magazines with year of establishment missing
Magazines disestablished in 2008
Mediacorp
Monthly magazines published in Singapore
Magazines published in Singapore